Martin Mackin is a former Irish Fianna Fáil politician who served briefly as a senator for the final weeks of the 21st Seanad in 2002, when he was nominated by the Taoiseach, Bertie Ahern to fill one of the vacancies caused by the election of a nominated senator to Dáil Éireann. He is a former press secretary for the Fianna Fáil party and was General Secretary of the party from 1998 until 2003.

References

Year of birth missing (living people)
Living people
Fianna Fáil senators
Members of the 21st Seanad
Nominated members of Seanad Éireann